Pat Brisson (born January 22, 1965) is a Canadian National Hockey League Players' Association (NHLPA) agent and co-head of the Hockey Division of Creative Artists Agency with partner J.P. Barry. He is also the father of the Vegas Golden Knights prospect Brendan Brisson.

Hockey career 
Brisson moved to Los Angeles in 1987. In the early 1990s, Brisson founded "Skate with the Pros" and "California Dreamin"—youth hockey schools that feature NHL stars and coaches as instructors. He was an important figure in the growth of hockey in Southern California with his involvement with Iceoplex, a chain of ice rinks.

Brisson enjoyed a successful junior hockey career in the Quebec Major Junior Hockey League (QMJHL), averaging over a point per game with the Verdun Juniors, Drummondville Voltigeurs and Hull Olympiques, where he played for future NHL coach Pat Burns and with NHL great Luc Robitaille.

Agent career 
Brisson has a high-profile client roster, including former Hart Memorial Trophy and Art Ross Trophy winner Sidney Crosby, Patrick Kane, Anže Kopitar and Jonathan Toews. During the 2014 off-season, he negotiated matching eight-year, $84 million contracts—the highest average annual value of any contract since the introduction of the NHL's salary cap in 2005—for Chicago Blackhawks teammates Patrick Kane and Jonathan Toews. During the 2017–18 NHL season, Brisson engineered the high-profile 3-team trade between the Colorado Avalanche, Nashville Predators, and Ottawa Senators that ended with client Matt Duchene being moved from the Avalanche to the Senators.

Over the course of his career, he has represented Hockey Hall of Fame inductees Luc Robitaille and Chris Chelios. Since 2005, Brisson has represented six first overall selections in the NHL Entry Draft, including three consecutive (Sidney Crosby in 2005, Erik Johnson in 2006, Patrick Kane in 2007). Brisson is the agent for John Tavares, who went first in the 2009 Draft and for Nathan MacKinnon, who went first in 2013. Additional clients Brisson represents include Jonathan Bernier, Claude Giroux, Carl Hagelin, Seth Jones, Kyle Okposo, Andrew Shaw, and Mathew Barzal among others.

Awards and recognition 
In 2017, Brisson was named the 9th most powerful agent in all of sports by Forbes, in 2016, he was ranked #7, in 2015, he was ranked #10. Additionally, he is consistently ranked as one of the 100 most powerful people in the National Hockey League (NHL) by The Hockey News. He has negotiated hundreds of millions of dollars in contracts during his career for the players he represents. The Hollywood Reporter did a piece on Brisson titled "A Day in the Life of CAA's Very own Jerry MacGuire".

Hockey career statistics

References

External links

1965 births
Living people
Canadian sports agents
Drummondville Voltigeurs players
French Quebecers
Hull Olympiques players
Ice hockey people from Quebec
Sportspeople from Salaberry-de-Valleyfield
Verdun Juniors players
Sports agents